In some team sports, an attacker is a specific type of player, usually involved in aggressive play. Heavy attackers are, usually, placed up front: their goal is to score the most possible points for the team. In association football, attackers are also referred to as forwards or strikers.

See also 
 List of footballers with the most official appearances
 List of goalscoring goalkeepers
 List of hat-tricks
 List of men's footballers with 50 or more international goals
 List of top international men's association football goal scorers by country

Notes

Football positions